Albatrellus citrinus is a species of fungus in the family Albatrellaceae. Found in Europe, it was described as new to science by Svengunnar Ryman and colleagues in 2003.

See also
Fuller comparative discussion at Albatrellus subrubescens

References

External links

Russulales
Fungi described in 2003
Fungi of Europe